Michael Holt may refer to:

Michael Holt (English footballer) (born 1977)
Michael Holt (German footballer) (born 1986)
Michael Holt (snooker player) (born 1978), English snooker player 
Michael Holt (musician) (born 1968), American musician
Mister Terrific (Michael Holt), DC Comics superhero
Michael Holt (author) (born 1929), British puzzle-book author